The McCraith House is a modernist house located in Dromana, Victoria, Australia positioned atop a stone walled plinth over-looking Port Phillip Bay. Due to its unique geometric shape, this building is commonly referred to as the Butterfly House or Larrakeyah. In 1954, Gerald and Ellen McCraith commissioned emerging Melbourne-based architect partnership Chancellor and Patrick to design the beachside weekender, which was completed in 1956.
Exemplary of structurally inspired modernist architecture in Australia, The McCraith house is national heritage listed and remains astonishingly close to its original state including "exterior and interior wall colours, furniture, crockery, even the bed linen".

Design
The layout of the Butterfly house set a new standard for holiday houses in Australia. A stone plinth holds the main living and private spaces to emphasize the view of the bay. The Children Bedroom and laundry are located on the ground floor, allowing the main active spaces such as the lounge room to have priority access to the views. The connection to the exterior was strengthened through the open plan living, removing the strict separation of the traditional dining area, lounge and exterior lounge. This provides a more relaxed and free flowing movement within the house, complementing the associated lifestyle of beach-side living. Owing to the increased availability of family cars, a sheltered parking space is included underneath the cantilevered floor resulting in ease of access for residents.

Construction
The Butterfly House is one of the earliest examples in Australia to use prefabricated structural steel in a domestic building. The structural core consists of two triangulated truss frames, bolted to large concrete footings at the inverted tip of the triangles. Steel 'C' section purlins and steel cross bracing form the base of the first floor, tying the triangulated truss frames together.  The two dominant floor beams overlap the first floor truss supporting a series of timber floor joists that are cantilevered at each end forming the balcony and a portion of the living space floor. The 'Butterfly' roof is supported by a series of timber joists in a specific geometric configuration.

Style
The McCraith house is framed by a steel triangular structural system which represents the simplification of form that is a familiar aspect within the modernist architectural movement. Ornamentation is derived through the structural elements applied to the exterior, which contrast the classical approach to architectural embellishment. The house maintains the presentation of a modernist building whilst including the prominent architectural vernacular of the veranda.

Similar buildings
Elements from the McCraith house are found in the design of Iggulden House located in Beaumaris. The most notable similarities between these two houses are cantilevers created by the projected horizontal lines and butterfly roof. Use of material contrast to emphasize change in program can be recognised in both buildings, where the timber beams of the veranda meet the glass threshold and pass through to the exposed stone walls. The post-and-beam structure is heavily pronounced in the exterior which is also seen in Richard Neutra's Miller House. The materiality of the McCraith House is also comparable to Richard Nuetra's "Miller House" through the use of glass and steel in its design to allow natural light to flow through the house. Both are rare examples of domestic steel construction from the mid twentieth century.

Recent history
Recently the McCraith house has featured in several exhibitions by the Mornington Peninsula Regional Gallery, including 'The house on the hill' and 'Desire and identity: The architecture of Chancellor and Patrick' in 2006 and 2010 respectively, recognising the talent and work of Chancellor & Patrick . The house was also the focus of a story on ABC's Sunday Arts programme, which was screened on the 19 November 2006.

Gallery

References

1954 establishments in Australia
Houses in Victoria (Australia)
Houses completed in 1954